Pietrele River may refer to:

 Pietrele, a tributary of the Vâja in Gorj County
 Pietrele, a tributary of the Sibișel in Hunedoara County